Agdistis sphinx is a moth in the family Pterophoridae. It is known from Algeria and Morocco.

The wingspan is 28–35 mm. The forewings are bright grey.

The larvae feed on Limoniastrum species, including Limoniastrum guyonianum.

Etymology
The species is named for the curious resemblance of the larva to a young larva of one of the Sphingidae, the protruding tubercle above the head having exactly the appearance of an anal horn, while the attenuation of the body posteriorly represents the form of a Sphingid larva in the reverse position.

References

Agdistinae
Moths described in 1907